"For Love of Love" was the thirteenth and final episode of the first series of the British television series, Upstairs, Downstairs. The episode is set in 1908.

Plot

In about 1908, James, by now a Captain, enters an affair with the former house maid Sarah, who is now a music hall singer. Soon, Sarah becomes pregnant by James, who is in debt of around £1350. Sarah gives him some of her earnings. Elizabeth marries the poet Lawrence Kirbridge. Sarah turns up at Elizabeth's wedding, apparently at James's invitation.

References

Upstairs, Downstairs (series 1) episodes
1972 British television episodes
Fiction set in 1908